The Chiesa dei Rossi or Church of the Red is a Baroque-style, Roman Catholic small church in the town of Varzi, province of Pavia, region of Lombardy, Italy. The church was originally an oratory of a confraternity of flagellants (battuti), the Confraternity of the Holiest Trinity, known for the red (Rossi) color in their processional vestments.

History
Located within the medieval walls, an oratory was first erected here in 1275. The present church was rebuilt by 1636. The single nave contains a wooden statue of a Guardian Angel (1684) by Antonio Perico, with gilding by Ambrogio Giussano. The walnut pulpit is carved in 15th-century style.

References

Churches in the province of Pavia
Baroque church buildings in Lombardy
17th-century Roman Catholic church buildings in Italy
Varzi